Crime in Cincinnati, Ohio has been a concern of residents since the 18th century.

Earliest years
The first recorded crime in Cincinnati's history was a petty theft in 1789.  Under the judgement of William McMillan, informally appointed justice of the peace, one Patrick Grimes was sentenced to twenty-nine lashes after being caught stealing cucumbers. That occurred during the first year of the settlement, then still named "Losantiville", when  food and other resources were extremely scarce.

Controversies over law enforcement quickly followed the establishment of government in the community: the military commander at Fort Washington deemed the region to be under his government, rejecting any authority set up by the settlers.  When a second crime was reported to Judge McMillan, the accused fled to the fort for refuge, and the commander ordered Losantiville's court to renounce its jurisdiction. The judge replied with a message suggesting that the commander mind his own business, and blows ensued when a detachment of soldiers was sent to arrest the judge.

However, permanent civilian law enforcement was established soon after the incident.  In August 1788, the Northwest Territory legislature, meeting in Marietta, had enacted an enabling act creating a Court of Quarter Sessions for the region, and local residents quickly took advantage of the law's provisions; William McMillan was named one of the court's first judges.

Crime over time

Overall violent crime reached an all-time low in 2022; rape and robbery went up that year, while homicides and aggravated assaults decreased. Property crimes went up in 2022, primarily drive by an increase in auto thefts.

Using FBI data for 2019, Cincinnati ranks 19th in the 100 most populous cities in the U.S. for overall crime rate (includes both violent and property crime). 

Homicides reached a record high 94 in 2020, and the record was matched in 2021. There were 78 homicides in 2022; of those, 64 involved a firearm.

The City of Cincinnati publishes several public safety dashboards online:

 Fire & Rescue
 Emergency Medical Services
 Police Calls for Service
 911 Call Performance
 Alternative Response to Crisis
 Reported Crime
 Reported Shootings
 Traffic Crashes
 Police Firearm Discharge
 Use of Force
 Assaults on Officers
 Traffic Stops
 Pedestrian Stops
 Closed Citizen Complaints

References 

 
Cincinnati, Ohio